Streptomyces longwoodensis is a bacterium species from the genus of Streptomyces which has been isolated from soil the Longwood Gardens in Philadelphia in the United States.

See also 
 List of Streptomyces species

References

Further reading

External links
Type strain of Streptomyces longwoodensis at BacDive -  the Bacterial Diversity Metadatabase	

longwoodensis
Bacteria described in 1981